Birch Vale railway station served the village of Birch Vale, Derbyshire, England, from 1868 to 1970 on the Hayfield branch.

History 
The station was opened in May 1868 by the Manchester, Sheffield and Lincolnshire Railway. It closed on 5 January 1970.

References 

Disused railway stations in Derbyshire
Railway stations in Great Britain opened in 1868
Railway stations in Great Britain closed in 1970
1868 establishments in England
1970 disestablishments in England